Harriet Elizabeth "Hally" Wood (September 29, 1922 – July 22, 1989) was an American musician, singer and folk musicologist. She worked with John and Alan Lomax and participated in the publication of songbooks for the works of artists like Lead Belly and Woody Guthrie. She also performed as a singer and recorded solo and collaborative albums with folk singers such as Pete Seeger.

Early life
She was born Harriet Elizabeth Wood in Washington, D.C., in 1922. She was the daughter of a U.S. Army doctor who had worked in Hawaii and the Philippines before settling in Texas in 1935, when she was 13 years old. Her father was a versatile musician, who taught Hally songs and how to play them on organ, piano and guitar. She was a classically trained musician and singer and, while studying music at the University of Texas at Austin, she met John and Alan Lomax and became interested in folk music.

Career
After World War II, Wood moved to New York City to work with such folk musicians as Woody Guthrie, Lead Belly and Pete Seeger. As a musicologist, she transcribed a number of Lomax field recordings (collecting words and notes down on paper). She later also researched and transcribed several books of songs: one by Lead Belly (1959), then the New Lost City Ramblers Songbook (1964, later renamed Old-Time Stringband Songbook), and also two books of songs by Woody Guthrie (1972 and 1977, respectively).

As a singer, she had two solo albums in the early 1950s: Hally Wood Sings Texas Folksongs (Stinson Records label), and Oh Lovely Appearance of Death (Elektra Records label). She appeared on several concert/compilation albums, sang in concerts with Pete Seeger, Lead Belly, Woody Guthrie, Jean Ritchie, and others in the NYC area, including a concert at Carnegie Hall on Saturday, December 21, 1957, with Sonny Terry and Dave Sears.

From the late 1950s into the early 1970s, Wood lived in Río Piedras, Puerto Rico, where she helped produce concerts, among other activities. On May 23, 1960, Alan Lomax visited her there and recorded 29 songs in a single day.

She worked on a book with Joseph Lomax about songs written by Townes Van Zandt, published in 1977. In its preface, she is credited with musical proof-reading and lyrics corrections. In 1980, Wood brought out a self-produced album in Houston, Songs to Live By (Tannehill Records label), and was beginning work on another in the mid-80s when she was diagnosed with cancer.

Personal life
Wood was married three times:

 (1940 – 1947) John Henry Faulk (August 21, 1913 – April 9, 1990), a radio broadcaster, writer and activist with whom she had one daughter: Cynthia Tannehill Faulk Ryland (born in Austin, TX., November 28, 1943 - died in Elgin, TX., January 11, 2013)
 (1947 – 1954) Louis H. Gordon (born in New York, NY., November 15, 1915 – March 25, 2006), a veteran of the Spanish Civil War, Abraham Lincoln Brigade and labor organizer.
 (1958 – 1978) Robert Clarence McLeod Stephenson (born in San Francisco, CA., May 6, 1893 – died Austin TX., July 7, 1978), a teacher and professor of English.

Discography
Solo
  Hally Wood Sings Texas Folksongs (195?)
  Oh Lovely Appearance of Death (1953)
 Rio Piedras 5/60 (1960)
 Songs to Live By (1980)

Bibliography

References

External links
 

 

 

1922 births
1989 deaths
People from Washington, D.C.
20th-century American musicians
20th-century American singers
American folk-song collectors
American folklorists
Women folklorists
American music historians
University of Texas at Austin College of Fine Arts alumni
Deaths from cancer in Texas
20th-century American women singers
20th-century American musicologists
American women historians